The American Volunteers were a British Loyalist unit during the American Revolutionary War.

Company formed
British Army Major Patrick Ferguson raised the "American Volunteers" in 1779 in the Province of New York.

Campaigns
In 1780, the Volunteers were sent to the Siege of Charleston. On 2 May 1780 they captured the redoubt at Haddrell's Point. The Battle of King's Mountain resulted in the death of Major Ferguson and the unit's virtual annihilation.

References

External links
 Index to American Volunteers History - The On-Line Institute for Advanced Loyalist Studies

Loyalist military units in the American Revolution